Szymon Pawlak (born July 22, 1986) is a Polish football (defender) playing currently for Unia Janikowo. He is a trainee of UKS SMS Łódź.

Clubs
 2005-2006  UKS SMS Łódź
 2006–present  Unia Janikowo

External links
 

1986 births
Living people
Polish footballers
Unia Janikowo players
Footballers from Łódź
Association football defenders
Place of birth missing (living people)
21st-century Polish people